Combat camp or variant, may refer to:

 Military camp, a camp for a military force in preparation for combat
 Training camp, a camp for educational, sports, correctional activities involving aerobic, training, fitness, and sports activities
 Training camp for military recruit training, a camp to train people to become warriors
 "Combat Camp", an episode of Amphibia

See also

 
 Combat (disambiguation)
 Camp (disambiguation)
 War camp (disambiguation)
 Battle camp (disambiguation)
 Boot camp (disambiguation)